Petr Černý FRSC (8 January 1934 – 7 April 2018) was a mineralogy professor at the University of Manitoba.

Černý's studies focus on pegmatite. He is best known for his geological mapping of Bernic Lake, Manitoba in the 1970s. The site has since hosted several tantalum-lithium-caesium mines, for example the Tanco Mine.

Honours
1991, made a fellow of the Royal Society of Canada
1991, bestowed an honorary doctorate by the University of Manitoba
1993, awarded the Logan Medal by the Geological Association of Canada
the mineral cernyite was named in his honour
elected an honorary member of the Learned Society of Czech Republic
received a medal from the Asociacion Geologica Argentina

References

University of Manitoba Alumni Newsletter- December 2002
University of Manitoba- 2002 Annual Report
Miguel Á. Galliski, David London, Milan Novák, and Robert F. Martin (2012). Granitic Pegmatites and their Minerals: a Tribute to Petr Černý. Can Mineral 50: 777-780.
Miguel Á. Galliski, David London, Milan Novák, and Robert F. Martin (2012). Granitic Pegmatites and their Minerals: a Second Tribute to Petr Černý. Can Mineral 50: 1441–1444.

External links 

 Masaryk University
 University of Manitoba

1934 births
2018 deaths
Canadian geologists
Canadian mineralogists
Fellows of the Royal Society of Canada
Academic staff of the University of Manitoba
Canadian people of Czech descent
Logan Medal recipients
Scientists from Brno